Tamil Nadu Dr. Ambedkar Law University (TNDALU) is a public state university established in 1997 at Chennai, India by the Government of Tamil Nadu under The Tamil Nadu Dr. Ambedkar Law University Act, 1996, which also brought all law colleges in Tamil Nadu under the control of the university. It was named after B. R. Ambedkar, an Indian jurist, social reformer and the architect the Constitution of India. The university was inaugurated on 20 September 1997 by K. R. Narayanan, former president of India. The university started a law school on its own campus in 2002 as the School of Excellence in Law, Chennai (SOEL).

Academics
At the undergraduate level, SOEL has a three-year course leading to a Bachelor of Laws (LL.B.), and five-year integrated double-degree courses leading to a combination between a LL.B. and a Bachelor of Arts, Bachelor of Computing, Bachelor of Business Administration, or Bachelor of Computer Application.

The Postgraduate Department provides Master of Laws degrees across nine different branches.

Campus
Chief minister J Jayalalithaa in February 2016 unveiled a state-of-the-art campus for the TN Dr Ambedkar Law University at Perungudi next to Taramani MRTS station. The new campus has separate blocks for administration and classes, besides a library at a cost of 59.27 crore. The CM opened the facility through video conferencing from her chamber at the Secretariat. The campus also has hostel facilities for girls and a playground with gallery.

Affiliated colleges

Government law colleges

Private Law colleges

References

External links
Official Website

Law schools in Tamil Nadu
Universities in Chennai
Educational institutions established in 1997
1997 establishments in Tamil Nadu